Setsoto FM Stereo is a South African community radio station based in the Free State. The station is directly responsible and accountable to Maluti Media Network as a community-based project; Setsoto FM is operated by volunteers from within the community of Greater Ficksburg and its surrounding areas.
Its vision is to create an empowered and responsible community in a way that is accountable, participatory and transparent.

Coverage areas 
From its studios in Ficksburg
East into Bloemfontein, covering areas such as:
Ficksburg
Senekal
Marquard
Clocolan
Ladybrand
Maseru in Lesotho
Leribe in (Lesotho)

Broadcast languages
English 30%
SeSotho 60%
Afrikaans 10%

Broadcast time
24/7

Target audience
Multicultural community
LSM Groups 1 - 8
Age Group 16 - 49

Programme format
45% Talk
55% Music

Listenership Figures

References

External links
 AudioStreaming Website

Community radio stations in South Africa
Mass media in the Free State (province)